Quickfit is a brand of laboratory glassware, produced under the Pyrex trademark and distributed through various fronts in differing countries; e.g. Corning in North America. The glassware is well known worldwide for its build quality and it appears in numerous laboratories. A large percentage of the glassware makes use of ground glass joints.

The QuickFit brand is blown in Stone, Staffordshire, in the United Kingdom and marketed through the Scilabware front in the United Kingdom. 'Quickfit' has become a genericized trademark for all ground glass. Whilst the ownership and name of QuickFit has changed numerous times, all genuine QuickFit glass is stamped with a Q, displaying the brand name, the word Pyrex and the part code.

Timeline
1923, James A. Jobling licensed to produce Pyrex branded glassware

1946, Quartz and QuickFit glassware goes into production at Stone

1970, Quickfit becomes a part of Jobling Lab Division

1973, Quickfit joins the Corning company

1982, Name changed to J Bibby Scientific Products

1986, Name changed to Bibby Sterilin

2005, they become Barloworld Scientific,

2008, add disposable plastics to the product range and change the name to Scilabware

References

Laboratory glassware